William Milner  may refer to:

 Sir William Milner, 1st Baronet, MP for York
 Sir William Milner, 3rd Baronet, MP for York
 Sir William Milner, 5th Baronet, MP for York
 Sir William Frederick Victor Mordaunt Milner, 8th Baronet, of the Milner Baronets
 William Milner (died 1942), station foreman at York railway station, killed by bombing in World War II